Ganeer Township is one of seventeen townships in Kankakee County, Illinois, USA.  As of the 2010 census, its population was 3,215 and it contained 1,411 housing units.

History
Ganeer Township came into being on February 15, 1859. The township was excised from land in Momence Township.

Geography

Cities, towns, villages
 Momence (partial)
 Sun River Terrace (northeast three-quarters)

Unincorporated towns
 Eldridge at 
 Exline at 
 Koster at 
 Saint George at 
(This list is based on USGS data and may include former settlements.)

Adjacent townships
 Sumner Township (north)
 Yellowhead Township (northeast)
 Momence Township (east)
 Pembroke Township (southeast)
 St. Anne Township (south)
 Aroma Township (southwest)
 Bourbonnais Township (west)
 Kankakee Township (west)
 Manteno Township (northwest)

Cemeteries
The township contains these four cemeteries: Momence, Mount Airy, Saint George and Saint Patricks.

Major highways
  Illinois Route 1
  Illinois Route 17
  Illinois Route 114

Airports and landing strips
 Saint George Airport

Demographics

Government
The township is governed by an elected Town Board of a Supervisor and four Trustees.  The Township also has an elected Assessor, Clerk, Highway Commissioner and Supervisor.  The Township Office is located at  120 West Washington, Momence, IL 60954.

Political districts
 Illinois's 11th congressional district
 State House District 79
 State Senate District 40

School districts
 Manteno Community Unit School District 5
 Momence Community Unit School District 1
 Grant Park Community Unit School District 6
 St George Community consolidated School District 258

References
 
 United States Census Bureau 2007 TIGER/Line Shapefiles
 United States National Atlas

External links
 Kankakee County Official Site
 City-Data.com
 Illinois State Archives

Townships in Kankakee County, Illinois
Populated places established in 1853
Townships in Illinois